Russian Standard may refer to:

 Russian Standard Corporation, a Russian holding company which owns:
 Russian Standard Company, a Russian company which produces
 Russian Standard Vodka, a Russian vodka
 Russian Standard Bank, a Russian bank
 Russian Standard Insurance, a Russian insurance company